Joseph "Jef" Lowagie (1 November 1903 – 18 December 1985) was a Belgian cyclist. He competed at the 1928 and 1936 Summer Olympics.

References

External links
 

1903 births
1985 deaths
Belgian male cyclists
Olympic cyclists of Belgium
Cyclists at the 1928 Summer Olympics
Cyclists at the 1936 Summer Olympics
Cyclists from West Flanders
People from Bredene